Kirkby Bentinck railway station was a station serving the town of Kirkby-in-Ashfield, Nottinghamshire, England. It was on the Annesley branch of the Manchester, Sheffield and Lincolnshire Railway, later the Great Central Railway on the section from Nottingham Victoria to Sheffield Victoria. The station was opened in January 1893 and closed in March 1963 after 70 years in service. Until 1 August 1925 it was named Kirkby & Pinxton station, and it also appeared on some Ordnance Survey maps as Kirkby & Bentinck station.

Present day
Nothing remains of Kirkby Bentinck station apart from two concrete poles that held the station sign and the station master's  house on Church Hill.  The site is now used for agriculture.

References

External links
 includes map of local railways

Former services

Former Great Central Railway stations
Disused railway stations in Nottinghamshire
Kirkby-in-Ashfield
Railway stations in Great Britain opened in 1893
Railway stations in Great Britain closed in 1963